That Might Well Be It, Darling is a studio album by Scottish indie folk musician King Creosote, released on 21 April 2013 on Domino Records. Produced by Paul Savage, and released in conjunction with Record Store Day 2013, the album is a full-band re-recording of Creosote's limited edition vinyl release, That Might Be It, Darling (2010), and was initially released as three EPs: I Learned from the Gaels (2012), To Deal With Things (2012) and It Turned Out for the Best (2012).

Frequent collaborator Alan "Gummi Bako" Stewart sings lead vocals on the album's opening and closing tracks.

Background and recording
In 2010, King Creosote released a vinyl-only studio album, That Might Be It, Darling, which was only available to purchase at live performances. The album was predominantly an acoustic release, with appearances from frequent collaborator Alan "Gummi Bako" Stewart and Rich Young. In December 2010, Creosote and his band entered Chem 19 studios with producer Paul Savage to record a full-band version of the album. Regarding the recording process, Creosote noted, "I wanted Darling to sound like we'd just barged in to the studio and faffed our way through it, which we kind of did, and nothing ended up the way we thought it would."

Reception

The Independent'''s Andy Gill gave the album a very positive review, writing: "[That Might Well Be It, Darling] may well be Kenny Anderson's best album."

Track listingAll tracks written by Kenny Anderson, except where noted.''
"Little Man" (Alan Stewart)
"Single Cheap"
"Doubles Underneath"
"Near Star, Pole Star" (Anderson/Jennifer Gordon)
"Ankle Shackles"
"The Right Form"
"What Exactly Have You Done?"
"On the Night of the Bonfire"
"I Am Cellist"
"February 29th"
"Going Gone" (Alan Stewart/Anderson)

Recording personnel

King Creosote Band
Kenny Anderson - lead vocals, acoustic guitar, electric guitar, Schechter guitar, accordion, piano, samples, vibraphone, washboard, wine glasses
Gavin Brown - drums, keyboards, samples, synths
Peter Macleod - electric bass, electric guitar
Derek O'Neill - keyboards, organ, piano, Wurlitzer, string arrangements
Richard Parkinson - acoustic guitar, electric guitar
Andrew Robinson - drums, djembe
Alan Stewart - lead vocals (1 and 11), acoustic guitar

Additional Musicians
Kate Duffy - violin
Vic Galloway - backing vocals
Jennifer Gordon - acoustic guitar, vocals (4)
Peter Harvey - cello, string arrangements
Kate Lazda - backing vocals
Kate Miguda - violin
Richard Young - piano

Recording personnel
Paul Savage - producer, recording
Derek O'Neill - recording assistant
Guy Davie - mastering

Artwork
Kenny Anderson - artwork
Midget Squid - digital design
Matt Cooper - digital design
Nicola Meighan - liner notes

References

2013 albums
King Creosote albums
Record Store Day releases